The  is a minivan manufactured by Nissan Shatai for Nissan since 1997, available in three generations, with model codes E50 (1997–2002), E51 (2002–2010), and E52 (2010–present). The E50 Elgrand was also configured and produced as a light commercial vehicle from 1998 to 2017.

The Elgrand's main competitors are the Toyota Alphard and the Toyota Vellfire. Previously, the Honda Odyssey was also a competitor of the Elgrand until it was discontinued in 2022.

First generation (E50; 1997)

The first generation of the Nissan Elgrand was produced from May 1997 to May 2002, with commercial versions remaining in production until December 2017. Various engine combinations were available including the petrol VG33E, VQ35DE and diesel QD32ETi and ZD30DDTi. The E50 had a 4 speed automatic transmission and came in either 2- or 4-wheel drive. The Caravan Elgrand was exclusive to Nissan Bluebird Store, while the Homy Elgrand was exclusive to Japanese Nissan Prince Store dealerships. The Elgrand assumed the Caravan Coach's passenger carrying duties with a luxury enhancement. The top trim level equipment packages were installed with internet enabled satellite navigation called CarWings.

Trim levels
The E50 version of the Elgrand came in several trim levels including: V, VG, X, XL, Highway Star, Rider, and S Edition.

Model variations
Isuzu Fargo Filly
From 1997 to 2002, the E50 Elgrand was rebadged and sold by Isuzu as the Fargo Filly in the Japanese market.

On April 4, 2013, two Fargo Filly vans were subjected to recalls due to issues regarding the durability of the battery cable's plastic band is not durable, which causes it to touch the exhaust tube when it breaks to potentially cause a short circuit. On February 19, 2016, 15 Fargo Filly vans made between January 1999 and December 2001 were subjected to recalls due to engine issues that prevent the driver from starting it.

Nissan Paramedic and Isuzu Super Medic II
In May 1998, the second generation  ambulance was introduced on the E50 Elgrand chassis. To facilitate ambulance use, the body of the E50 Paramedic from the B pillar rearward was carried over from the Paramedic II, a high-roof ambulance version of the E24 Caravan, to increase interior space in the rear of the ambulance. The E50 Paramedic was facelifted in 2006 and remained in production until December 2017, when it was replaced by a third generation based on the E26 NV350 Caravan.

The E50 Paramedic was also marketed by Isuzu as the Super Medic II until 2002.

On April 4, 2013, 12 Fargo Filly vans were subjected to recalls due to issues regarding the durability of the battery cable's plastic band is not durable, which causes it to touch the exhaust tube when it breaks to potentially cause a short circuit. On February 19, 2016, 15 Super Medic II vans made between January 1999 and December 2001 were subjected to recalls due to engine issues that prevent the driver from starting it.

Elgrand Jumbo Taxi
Between 2000 and 2011, a 10-passenger commercial van based on the E50 Paramedic was offered under the Elgrand Jumbo Taxi nameplate.

World markets
Used E50 Elgrands are commonly exported to Australia, Canada, New Zealand, Russia, UK, and formerly the Philippines before the ban on importation of right-hand drive vehicles. The Australian and New Zealand fleets of Wicked Campers include E50 Elgrands.

Gallery

Second generation (E51; 2002)

The second generation E51 Elgrand was launched in May 2002 and primarily competes with the Toyota Alphard and Honda Elysion. The Jumbo Taxi and Paramedic did not move to the new platform, instead remaining on the previous E50 chassis.

Initial release
The model specifications were V VG, X XL, with later releases including the Highway Star and Rider versions - the bottom specification model was a V, whereas the top specification vehicle was an XL, with full leather interior.

The Rider had two variations including an Autech Tuned Nismo version.

The XL E51 was the top-end model within the Elgrand range.

Innovation
Options for the E51 included some major innovations, firstly there was the CARWINGS technology, which included a GPS car tracking/ location system. But alongside this was the innovation of reversing camera with turning guidance lines, lane control and assisted braking. This was an additional feature back in 2002 for top-end Nissan Vehicles. In 2008 there was further innovation in the form of 4 view camera technology that provided an aerial all-round view when reversing. Other Innovations including voice-activated controls, BOSE Audio or 5.1 channel surround sound audio systems, auto voice-activated phone calls, and a satellite controlled clock.

Other additional options
Cruise control | Multi-deck CD | BOSE all round 9 speaker car system | Rear TV, with a 7" LCD screen

Windshield: There were several windshield options available, ranging from a standard fit, through to a water repellent, laser-etched, tinted screen. The water repellent screens have a holographic sticker to identify this additional option.

Nissan Elgrand, Autech Elgrand Enchante (2002–) 
JDM models went on sale on 21 May 2002. Early Nissan Elgrand models include XL, X, VG (4/5-doors), V, and Highway Star. Early Elgrand Enchant models included VG, V, and Highway Star. All model ranges can be configured with a removable second-row seat or Step Type.

Elgrand XL
This was the top of the range model, with many additional options fitted as standard. It came with a full leather 7-seat interior, 8 speaker sound system, which included Sony MiniDISC, keyless entry, Carwings, reversing camera, two TV screens, folding wing mirrors and heated driver and passenger seats.

Out of the complete range of Elgrand, this was also very heavy at 2.2 tons. Rider versions being the lightest version as it was originally conceived as a sports model, so had a lot of the additional features removed in view of reducing the weight/power ratio for the vehicle.

Elgrand Rider (2002–) 
The Rider was a version of the Elgrand VG 5-door with front bumper, billet grille, front fog lamp, side sill protector, rear under protector, rear upper combination lamp (clear type), rear winker finisher, clear side turn lamp, front heat cutting glass (with top shade), seat floor (in leather), door trim floor, third seat armrest, leather-wrapped stone texture 4-spoke steering wheel, leather-wrapped stone texture instrument shift knob, stone texture finisher, Rider sound system (MD/CD integrated AM/FM electronic tuner radio, 6 speakers and subwoofer), 17-inch aluminum road wheels, 215/60R17 tires, large-diameter sports muffler by Fujitsubo, low-height suspension, and the choice of 3 body colors; white pearl (3-coat pearl #QX1), diamond silver metallic (#KY0), black (#KH3; Rider), as well as ecru (S) interior color.

JDM models went on sale on 2 October 2002.

Autech Elgrand VIP (2002–) 
It is a version of Elgrand XL 4-seat with leather-wrapped rear seat with center armrest, electric slide step, trunk board with partition board, second seat long slide rail, rear-seat reading lamp with room lamp, rear-seat audio system (VHS+CD+DVD), electric ottoman, rear-seat audio speaker (6 speakers), electric outlet (AC100V, 100W), front cabinet, floor carpet, drawn-out table, black body color.

JDM models went on sale on 19 December 2002.

VG version L, Highway Star version L (2002–2003) 
VG version L and Highway Star version L are versions of the Nissan Elgrand VG and Highway Star, respectively, commemorating the sale of 250000 units of the Nissan Elgrand in Japan since May 1997. Changes include a Carwings DVD TV/navigation system, 2 Intelligent Keys (driver side, passenger side, back door sensor), rear-view camera with car width and distance display (color), Elgrand super sound system and 6 speakers (MD/CD integrated AM/FM electronic tuner radio, 160W, MD/CD autochanger connection), steering wheel controls for the audio, voice command, and hands-free phone, choice of 3 body colors: Champagne silver titan metallic, white pearl (3-coat pearl), black/sparkling silver metallic in VG version L; white pearl (3-coat pearl), sword metal metallic, diamond silver metallic in Highway Star version L.

JDM models went on sale between 24 December 2002 and 31 March 2003.

Elgrand Highway Star update, Elgrand Enchante front row passenger Lift Seat Type (2003–) 
Change to Elgrand Highway Star include fully plated front grille, chrome color coat aluminum road wheel, fog lamp surround in body colour, black steering wheel, suede tone cross-section seat floor Jacquard material in black, shift knob leather section in black, instrument panel center cluster control panel in dark grey. New options include driver seat auto slide door for an intelligent key model, leather or Supplier (from Elgrand X)-upholstered seat.

Elgrand Enchant

The Elgrand Enchant takes 8-passenger versions of the Elgrand V, VG, Highway Star, and X, and adds a mobility access seat in the second row.

JDM models went on sale on 27 August 2003.

Autech Elgrand Rider S (2003–) 
The Autech Rider S is a version of the 8-passenger Elgrand Rider with black floor, warm grey interior, antibacterial leather-wrapped 4-spoke sport steering wheel, antibacterial leather-wrapped titanium tone shift knob, titanium tone power window switch finisher, CD integrated AM/FM electronic tuner radio (120W, MD/CD autochanger support), and the choice of 3 body colors: White pearl (3-coat pearl #QX1), diamond silver metallic (#KY0), black (#KH3) (Rider exclusive), and a warm gray (W) interior color.

JDM models went on sale on 22 October 2003.

2004 update

Nissan Elgrand, Autech Elgrand Rider, Autech Elgrand Enchante (2004–) 

JDM models went on sale on 25 August 2004. Early updated models include VG (8-passenger), X (8-passenger), XL (7-passenger), and Highway Star (8-passenger). Early Autech Elgrand Rider models include Rider (8-passenger) and Rider S (8-passenger). Early Autech Elgrand Enchante models include VG (7-passenger), X (7-passenger), and Highway Star (7-passenger). Elgrand models with the VQ25DE engine were introduced at the end of 2004. Early Elgrand models with VQ25DE engine (on sale in 2004-12-22 in Japan) included V (8-seat), Highway Star (8-seat).

The updated Elgrand Enchante was unveiled at the 2004 Tokyo Motor Show.

Nissan Forum concept (2008)
The Nissan Forum is a concept vehicle based on the E51 Nissan Elgrand, developed by Nissan Design America. It features trackless sliding side doors, hidden sunshades in SkyView moonroof panels, LED lights front and rear, soft-edged side outside mirrors, wide six-spoke alloy wheels and low-profile tires, a wide rear hatch, dual exhaust outlets, dual climate controls, Bluetooth wireless technology and mood lighting under the upper and lower console areas. It also has a console-mounted microwave, vertical wave pattern carpeting, "Turntable" seating, a Bose media system, and Around View Monitor. The design of the Forum would be later used on the R42H Nissan Quest, the North American counterpart of the succeeding E52 Elgrand.

The concept was unveiled at the 2008 North American International Auto Show.

E51 specifications
The E51 Elgrand uses either the 2.5l or 3.5l V6 VQ-series engine combined with a five-speed automatic transmission with Tiptronic shift for better response. Additional transmission controls include Power and Snow settings, as well as 4x4 power options. It employs a multilink rear suspension with ventilated disc brakes all around.

E51 design and features

The E51 Elgrand is quite different from its predecessor, now equipped with power sliding doors, turn signal repeaters built into the side mirrors, a rear roof spoiler, and 16- (XL) or 17-inch (HWS) aluminum alloy wheels. The new front fascia, with a chromed grille, gives the Elgrand a sportier look.

Interior features include captain-style seats, an eight-speaker sound system with an optional nine-speaker system by Bose Corp., and a TV/DVD player with a  screen. The Elgrand is also equipped with an eight-inch (203mm) LCD monitor in the dashboard for the Carwings Vehicle Information System (also known as VIS). Optional extras include heated front seats, power curtains and finer levels of interior trim, such as woodgrain trim panels and a woodgrain steering wheel. The interior seating arrangement can be configured for dining by adjusting the front captain-style seats facing the back, and folding the second row of seats flat onto the seat cushions.

Like most newer models produced by Nissan, the Elgrand comes with the "Keyless-go" feature for enhanced user convenience. Higher spec Elgrands like the Highway Star, Rider, X, and XL versions come with an internal GPS system dedicated for use in Japan. An optional GPS system for Hong Kong and Guangdong Province in China is available.

The GPS system was not a satellite-based system, but a disc-operated CarWings system that played off a concealed DVD player via tracking the position of the vehicle via wheel sensors, against an inputted start and end position of a journey with incredible accuracy. CD Discs were only ever created for Japan and direct export countries.

E51 model variations
The Nissan Elgrand includes either a 3.5L  or 2.5L engine in five model types: V, VG, X, Highway Star, Rider, and XL.

The 2007 - 2010 refresh saw the discontinuation of the VG model.

E51 world markets
The E51 was only available through Nissan dealerships in Japan, with limited exports to Hong Kong and Brunei. The E51 is a popular grey import vehicle in Australia, the United Kingdom, Canada, and New Zealand.

E51 interiors

Third generation (E52; 2010)

The third generation E52 Elgrand, which ditched the previous generations' rear-wheel drive layout, shares a platform with the North American fourth generation R42H Quest.

The first revision of the Elgrand E52 was released in Japan on 18 August 2010. It was manufactured from August 2010 to January 2014. Across this time period there were six trim levels available. All models were available in front-wheel drive or all-wheel drive configurations with a continuously variable transmission being the only transmission option. A 250 prefix to the trim level represented a 2.5 litre inline-4 engine (QR25DE) while a 350 prefix to the trim level represented a 3.5 litre V6 engine (VQ35DE). Some models were available in both engine options while others were only available with one.

Trim levels
 Elgrand 250 XG
 Elgrand 250/350 Highway Star
 Elgrand 250/350 Highway Star Black Leather
 Elgrand 250/350 Highway Star Urban Chrome
 Elgrand 250/350 Highway Star Urban Chrome Black Leather
 Elgrand 350 Highway Star Premium

The Enchant, a version of the Elgrand with a mobility access seat in the second row, was available in the 250/350 Highway Star and the 250 XG.

In Japan, the Elgrand is one level below Nissan's largest van, called the Nissan Caravan which has been in production since the 1960s.

The E52 went on sale in Hong Kong on 20 October 2010 as a 2011 model year vehicle. Early models included Elgrand 350 Highway Star Premium. Elgrand Highway Star AVM and Elgrand Highway Star Dynamic with VQ35DE engine went on sale on 15 February 2012. ELGRAND 250 was added on 17 January 2013.

2011 update
Changes to the Elgrand for 2011 include:
Object motion sensor
Power liftgate (standard on 350 Highway Star, optional on 250 models)
Standard active AFS on 250 models

Urban Chrome is a version of the 250 Highway Star and 350 Highway Star with dark chrome grille, dark chrome fog lamp finisher, front protector, graphite-finish 18-inch aluminium wheels, clear rear combination lamp, LED high-mount strap lamp (clear type), and power sliding doors on the 250 Highway Star (standard on regular 350 Highway Star versions).

The 2011 update went on sale on 11 November 2011.

2012 update

Changes to the Elgrand for 2012 include:
Collision avoidance assist with brake override and 4 ultrasound sonar sensors as an option.
All 3.5-litre engine models features fuel efficiency improvements, making them eligible for eco car tax reductions.
On the 350 Highway Star Premium, the Carwings navigation system, 11-inch wide rear seat monitor entertainment system, around view monitor, intelligent cruise control, intelligent brake assist, and collision avoidance assist became standard equipment.
New metal grey colour (with multi-flex colour) for a total of 5 body colour choices.
The Highway Star Urban Chrome Black Leather and Highway Star Black Leather are versions of Nissan Elgrand 250 Highway Star Urban Chrome, 250 Highway Star, 350 Highway Star Urban Chrome, and 350 Highway Star with black leather seats with silver stitching, memory seats, steering wheel, and pedals, driver and front passenger power seats, steering wheel with leather wrapping and wood trim, reverse down-view liftgate mirror, and heated seats.

These models went on sale on 22 November 2012.

2014 facelift

Changes to the 2014 Elgrand include:
Chrome plate surrounding body (except 250 XG)
Redesigned headlights with LED daytime running lights/parking lights and LED headlights (except 250 XG)
New multi-spoke design for the 18-inch aluminum wheel (except 250 XG)
Chromed taillight inner lens (except 250 XG)
New body colour (imperial amber) for total of 5 colours (except 250 XG)
Grand black interior colour scheme for Highway Star Premium models
Black/dark bay brown interior colour scheme for Highway Star models
Redesigned gauges
5-inch Advanced Drive Assistant display with improved visibility
3rd row seats can slide fore and aft by 240mm
The height of the rear cargo cover was changed to improve interior volume
3rd row seatbacks are now reduced in convexity and concavity
Standard cruise control for all models
 Top-of-the-line VIP variant

The Autech Elgrand Rider is a version of the 350 Highway Star (FWD/AWD) and 250 XG (FWD/AWD) with front bumper, front grille, headlight finisher, rear bumper, emblem (Rider/AUTECH), 18-inch glossy aluminum wheels, lowered suspension, sport exhaust, seat upholstery (black leather; black cloth for 2.5-litre engine model), door trim at front and rear doors, finisher in mokume-gane pattern, and a choice of 3 body colours (brilliant white pearl 3-coat pearl (#QAB), phantom black pearl (#GAE), brilliant silver metallic (#K23)). Autech options include large roof spoiler and exclusive seat upholstery in premium white leather (3.5-litre engine model only). Autech dealer options include an exclusive front protector and exclusive front protector decal.

The facelift was unveiled at the 43rd Tokyo Motor Show (2013), followed by 2014 Tokyo Auto Salon (Rider High Performance Spec Black Line).

JDM models of the facelifted Elgrand went on sale on 15 January 2014. Early Nissan Elgrand models include 250 XG (8 passenger), 250 Highway Star (7/8 passenger), 250 Highway Star Premium (8 passenger), 350 Highway Star (7/8 passenger), and 350 Highway Star Premium (7 passenger).

JDM models of the facelifted Autech Elgrand went on sale on 20 January 2014. Early Autech Rider (Black Line) models include 250 XG (FWD/AWD), 350 Highway Star (FWD/AWD), while early Autech High Performance Spec (Black Line) models include 350 Highway Star (FWD). Early facelifted Autech Enchant models include 250 XG (FWD/AWD), 250 Highway Star (FWD/AWD), 350 Highway Star (FWD/AWD). Early facelifted Autech VIP 2 and VIP 3 models include 350 Highway Star (FWD/AWD).

The E52 Elgrand now faces serious competition with the third generation Toyota Alphard and sister model, the second generation Toyota Vellfire which launched on 26 January 2015. Both Alphard and Vellfire are hard traditional competitors of the Elgrand.

2020 facelift
The Elgrand received its second facelift on 12 October 2020.

International markets
There is a strong grey import market emerging for Elgrands in Canada, the United Kingdom, Australia, New Zealand, Russia and previously the Philippines. Growth in these markets is mainly driven by car enthusiasts, or an unfilled need for a seven- or eight- passenger vehicle in that market. In the Philippines, first generation models were converted to left-hand drive and sold before the ban of JDM vehicles.

In Hong Kong, E50 and E51 was imported in limited numbers, while the E52 is currently mass-imported. Both generations are sold officially by Nissan dealers.

In the United Kingdom, most Elgrands are imported for resale through specialist Japanese car import agents or dealerships. There is also a growing market in self-importing Elgrands by either purchasing directly through Japanese car auctions or online dealers.

In Australia, Elgrands are popular imports and are imported from Japanese import agents and special dealerships.

In Indonesia, the third-generation Elgrand was launched at the beginning of 2011. The Elgrand for that market is equipped with the 3.5L V6 petrol engine. The 2.5L 4-cylinder model was released in September 2012.

References

External links

Nissan page: World , HK, Japan,
Nissan Elgrand E50 page: 1997-1999, 1999-2000, 2001-2002
Nissan Elgrand E51 page: 2002-2004, 2004-2007, 2007-2010

Elgrand
Cars introduced in 1997
2000s cars
2010s cars
2020s cars
Minivans
Rear-wheel-drive vehicles
Front-wheel-drive vehicles
All-wheel-drive vehicles
Vehicles with CVT transmission